Albizia adianthifolia is a tree in the family Fabaceae. It is commonly known as the flat-crown. Its range extends from eastern South Africa to Tropical Africa.

Description
A profusion of bright green leaves and heavily scented, fluffy flowers are produced in winter or spring. The leaves are twice compound with the leaflets being 2–5 x 8 mm in size. This tree favours sandy soils in warm, high rainfall areas. In South Africa it is found in coastal lowland forests.

Cultivation
Albizia adianthifolia is cultivated as an ornamental tree. The attractive habit of these trees makes them a popular garden tree, often being retained as a native plant in suburban gardens when other indigenous vegetation is removed. The trees usually produce abundant seeds which are easily grown in sandy soil.

Ecological significance
Elephants browse the leaves of these trees and blue duiker favour the leaves and seedpods as food. The larvae of the satyr charaxes butterfly (Charaxes ethalion) feed on the leaves of these trees.

See also
Southern African Sand Forest

Gallery

References

adianthifolia
Trees of Africa
Garden plants of Africa
Ornamental trees